The Eyalet of the Morea was a first-level province (eyalet) of the Ottoman Empire, centred on the Peloponnese peninsula in southern Greece.

History

From the Ottoman conquest to the 17th century 
The Ottoman Turks overran the Peloponnese between 1458 and 1460, conquering the last remnants of the Byzantine Empire, with the exception of the Venetian strongholds, which were taken gradually over decades of intermittent Ottoman–Venetian Wars. Coron and Modon fell in 1500, and by 1540, the Ottoman conquest of the Peloponnese had been completed with the capture of Monemvasia and Nauplion.

Upon its conquest, the peninsula was made a sanjak of the Rumelia Eyalet, with its capital first at Corinth (Turk. Kordos or Gördes), later in Leontari (Londari), Mystras (Mezistre or Misistire) and finally in Nauplion (Tr. Anaboli). Since the 16th century, Mystras formed a separate sanjak, usually attached to the Eyalet of the Archipelago rather than Rumelia.

Creation of the eyalet, Venetian interlude and second Ottoman period 
Sometime in the mid-17th century, as attested by the traveller Evliya Çelebi, the Morea became the centre of a separate eyalet, with Patras (Ballibadra) as its capital. The Venetians occupied the entire peninsula during the successful Morean War (1684–1699), establishing the "Kingdom of the Morea" (It. Regno di Morea) to rule the country. Venetian rule lasted until the Ottoman reconquest in 1715.

The Morea Eyalet was re-established, headed by the Mora valesi, who until 1780 was a pasha of the first rank (with three horsetails) and held the title of vizier. After 1780 and until the Greek War of Independence, the province was headed by a muhassil. The pasha of the Morea was aided by a number of subordinate officials, including a Christian translator (dragoman), who was the senior Christian official of the province. The capital was first at Nauplia, but after 1786 at Tripolitza (Tr. Trabliçe).

The Moreote Christians rose against the Ottomans with Russian aid during the so-called "Orlov Revolt" of 1770, but it was swiftly and brutally suppressed. As a result, the total population decreased during this time, while the proportion of the Muslim element in it increased. Nevertheless, the privileges granted to the Orthodox population with the Treaty of Kuchuk-Kainarji, especially the right to trade under the Russian flag, led to a considerable economic flowering of the local Greeks, which, coupled with the increased cultural contacts with Western Europe (Modern Greek Enlightenment) and the inspiring ideals of the French Revolution, laid the groundwork for the Greek War of Independence.

During the Greek War of Independence, most of the peninsula fell to the Greek rebels in 1821–1822, but internal conflicts among the rebels and the arrival of Ibrahim Pasha of Egypt in 1825 almost extinguished the rebellion by 1826. The intervention of British, French and Russian naval troops in the Battle of Navarino forced the Ottoman and Egyptian troops to evacuate the Morea by 1 October 1828. Finally, Greece became independent from the Ottoman Empire with Treaty of Adrianople.

Administrative divisions
According to Evliya, at the time of his visit the eyalet comprised the sanjaks of Misistire, Aya Maura (Lefkada), Aynabahti (Lepanto), Karli-Eli, Manya (Mani Peninsula) and Ballibadra (Patras), i.e. it encompassed also the portions of western and central Continental Greece.

At the beginning of the 19th century, according to the French traveller François Pouqueville and the Austrian scholar Joseph von Hammer-Purgstall, the eyalet comprised the following sanjaks:
 Mora, i.e. the pasha-sanjak around the capital, Tripolitza
 Anavarin (Navarino)
 Arkadya (Kyparissia)
 Aynabahti
 Ballibadra (Patras)
 Gastuni (Gastouni)
 Messalonghi (Missolonghi)
 Kordos, but by the time of Pouqueville's visit with Anaboli as capital
 Koron
 Misistire
 Moton (Modon)
 Pirgos (Pyrgos)

Throughout both Ottoman periods, Morea was also divided into a number of smaller districts (kazas, kadiluks or beyliks), whose number varied but was usually between 22 and 25, and reached 27 by 1784. In the mid-17th century, when the Morea was still a sanjak, these were, according to Hajji Khalifa: Kordos, Arhos (Argos), Anaboli, Firina, Ayapetri (Agios Petros), Ruya, Manya (de facto free of Ottoman control), Kalavrita (Kalavryta), Kartina (Karytaina), Londari, Andrusa (Androusa), Koron, Motun, Anavarin, Arkadya (Kyparissia), Fanar (Fanari), Holomiç (Chlemoutsi), Voştiçe (Aigio), Ballibadra/Balye Badre. In addition, Misistra, Menceşe (Monemvasia) and Kalamata belonged to the sanjak of Misistire/Mezistre.

References

Sources
 
 
 
 
 

Eyalets of the Ottoman Empire in Europe
Ottoman Peloponnese
1661 establishments in the Ottoman Empire
1821 disestablishments in the Ottoman Empire